Rakhiv Raion is a raion in Zakarpattia Oblast in western Ukraine. Its administrative center is Rakhiv. Population: 

On 18 July 2020, as part of the administrative reform of Ukraine, the number of raions of Zakarpattia Oblast was reduced to six, and the area of Rakhiv Raion was significantly expanded. The January 2020 estimate of the raion population was

Administrative division 
City: Rakhiv (Rahó, Rachov between 1920–1938 and 1944–1945)

Urban-type settlements:

Kobyletska Poliana (Gyertyánliget, Poľana Kobilská)
Velykyi Bychkiv (Nagybocskó, Veľký Bočkov)
Yasinia (Kőrösmező, Jasyna)

Villages:
 
Bilyn (Bilin, Bilina)
Bila Tserkva (Tiszafejéregyház, Bilá Cirkev)
Bohdan (Tiszabogdány, Bila Tisa)
Breboia (Bértelek, Preboja)
Chorna Tysa (Feketetisza, Mogelki (between 1920–1938), Černá Tisa (1944–1945))
Dilove (Terebesfejérpatak, Trebušany)
Dobrik (Dobrikdülő, Dobrik)
Hoverla (Hóvár, Hoverla)
Khmeliv (Komlós, Chmely)
Kosivska Polyana (Kaszómező, Kosovská Poľana)
Kostylivka (Barnabás, Berlebaš)
Kruhlyy (Körtelep, Kruhlý)
Kvasy (Tiszaborkút, Kvásy)
Lazeshchyna (Mezőhát, Lazeština)
Lugi (Láposmező, Luhy)
Luh (Tizsalonka, Luh)
Plaiuts (Plajuc, Gandal)
Rosishka (Rászócska, Rosuška)
Roztoky (Nyilas, Rostoka)
Sitnyi (Szitni, Sitný)
Sredneye Vodyanoye (Középapsa, Stredná Apša)
Stebnev (Dombhát, Stebna)
Strymba (Almáspatak, Strimba)
Trostianets (Trosztyanec, Trsťenec)
Verkhneye Vodyanoye (Felsőapsa, Vyšná Apša)
Vilkhovatyy (Kiscserjés, Vilchovatý)
Voditsa (Kisapsa, Apšica)
Vydrychka (Vidráspatak, Vydryčka)

Note: Hungarian name of places are given in parenthesis at first. Slovakian name of ones were valid between 1920–1938 and 1944–1945.

Demographics 
In the 2001 census, the population of Rakhiv Raion was 90,900 which included:
 83.8% Ukrainians (76,200)
 3.2% Hungarians (2,900)
 11.6% Romanians (10,500)
 0.8% Russians (800)

See also
 Administrative divisions of Zakarpattia Oblast

References

External links
 rakhiv.adm.org.ua 

Raions of Zakarpattia Oblast
1945 establishments in Ukraine